Fullsteam Records is an independent group of music companies whose activities include a record label, promotion and booking agency, festivals, a distribution company, rehearsal rooms, merchandising, publishing and management.

Awarded as the "independent label of the year" in Finland nearly ten times, Fullsteam Records is one of the most important sources of new music from Finland. Fullsteam Records has put out almost 200 releases from tens of Finnish artists and bands.

Fullsteam Agency is the main independent concert promoter and booking agency in Finland. International highlights include Prince, The National, The Prodigy, Fleet Foxes, The Flaming Lips, Social Distortion, RUSH, Wilco, Lily Allen and hundreds of others. The domestic roster features some 100 artists.

Supersounds Music is a music and merchandise distribution company founded in 2003. In Finland Supersounds Music distributes international labels as Play It Again Sam (PIAS), Rough Trade, Earache, AFM, Warp, Ministry Of Sound, Sub Pop etc. The company also distributes Finnish music internationally.

Fullsteam Publishing works in cooperation with Air Chrysalis Music Publishing.

Fullsteam also runs Scandinavia's largest rehearsal room studio called Indie Center with over 50 rooms, and has its own merchandising and management businesses.

Some of the bands signed to Fullsteam Records

 Callisto
 Damn Seagulls
 Disco Ensemble
 Downstairs
 Ewert and The Two Dragons
 Flogging Molly (partially)
 Gogol Bordello (partially)
 Lapko
 NEØV
 No Shame
 Rubik
 Sister Flo
 Sweatmaster
 Ismo Alanko

1000 Records:

 Ceebrolistics
 Pedestrian´s Motor

Former artists:

 Abduktio
 Antero Lindgren
 Deep Insight
 Dust Eater Dogs
 Ganglion
 Koma
 Sela

Bands contracted with Fullsteam Agency

 Abduktio
 April
 Branded Women
 Callisto
 Damn Seagulls
 Disco Ensemble
 Endstand
 Evilsons
 I Walk The Line
 Knucklebone Oscar
 Lapko
 Lordi

 No Shame
 Poisonblack
 Rotten Sound
 Rubik
 Shake
 Sister Flo
 Swallow the Sun
 The Valkyrians
 Them Shepherds
 Tundramatiks

See also
 List of record labels

External links
 Fullsteam Records official website
 Fullsteam Records Myspace page
 Fullsteam Records YouTube page

Finnish record labels
Record labels established in 2002
Alternative rock record labels
Indie rock record labels
Rock record labels
2002 establishments in Finland